Oleg Zernikel (born 16 April 1995 in Almaty, Kazakhstan) is a German athlete specialising in the pole vault. He represented his country at the 2021 European Indoor Championships finishing fourth. Earlier he won a bronze medal at the 2014 World Junior Championships.

His personal bests in the event are 5.80 metres outdoors (Braunschweig 2021) and 5.81 metres indoors (Berlin 2022).

At the age of eleven, Zernikel came with his family from Kazakhstan to Landau in the Palatinate. His father was a long and high jumper.

International competitions

References

1995 births
Living people
Sportspeople from Almaty
German male pole vaulters
Athletes (track and field) at the 2020 Summer Olympics
Olympic athletes of Germany
German people of Kazakhstani descent
Kazakhstani emigrants to Germany